Advania is a Nordic information technology service corporation headquartered in Stockholm, Sweden. The company is the largest in its field in Iceland and the 9th largest in the Nordic countries. Advania has corporate clients in the public and private sector. It provides a range of IT-services, platforms, cloud services, and support to multinational enterprises, governments, and businesses.

History
Advania has roots in three Nordic countries, Iceland, Norway and Sweden . Over a long period of time each country generated a component of what eventually was braided into one company, Advania AB, in 2012.

EJS branch 
In 1939 the Icelandic entrepreneur Einar J. Skúlason founded EJS, an office equipment repair workshop in Reykjavik. He soon expanded his business, opened a store and started importing products like office machinery and cash registers.  During World War II the company also repaired guns and lighters. EJS eventually became a dominant IT business in Iceland. In 1952 the Icelandic government and the city of Reykjavik founded Skýrr, an IT company whose purpose was to take a leading role in computing and recordkeeping in Iceland. The company was privatized in 1995 and later became an important element in a group of companies – including EJS – that merged under the Skýrr brand.

Swedish branch 
In 1971, the IT company Nokia Elektronic AB – later renamed Datapoint Svenska AB – was founded in Sweden. The company sold Datapoint computer terminals but later became a network company and a system integrator in Sweden. In 2003 Datapoint merged with Virtus AB, an IT-company which was founded in 1994. The new company was named Kerfi AB.

Norwegian branch 
In 1991, Merkantildata Applikasjon was founded in Norway, originally as a business unit within Merkantildata (later ATEA). The company focused on implementing ERP solutions in the Nordic market, industry solutions for retail, property management, logistics, legal and transport & waste management. In 2000 the company changed its name to Hands and was listed on the Oslo Stock Exchange. In 2005 Hands was unlisted, as it was acquired by the Icelandic company Kögun which later merged with Skýrr. Despite changes in ownership, Hands managed to acquire Nett.2.3 and Completo in 2005.

In 2012, Advania AB was born, when Skýrr, Kerfi and Hands merged. Since then four companies have been acquired and merged with Advania, the listed Swedish IT company Caperio included.

Advania Finland 
In 2018, the Finnish IT & Digital Service provider Vintor became Advania Finland.

Goldman Sachs majority acquisition 
In February 2021, it was announced a Goldman Sachs merchant banking division had acquired a majority share of Advania.
They are now the owner by at least 51%.
The new owners aim to further accelerate Advania's growth both organically and through acquisitions.

On August 10, 2021, Advania acquired by Visolit.

References

 
2012 establishments in Iceland
Companies established in 2012
Privatised companies in Iceland
Cloud computing providers